Mirek Switalski (born 20 March 1952) is a Mexican sports shooter. He competed in the mixed skeet event at the 1976 Summer Olympics.

References

1952 births
Living people
Mexican male sport shooters
Olympic shooters of Mexico
Shooters at the 1976 Summer Olympics
Place of birth missing (living people)
Pan American Games medalists in shooting
Pan American Games bronze medalists for Mexico
Shooters at the 1975 Pan American Games
20th-century Mexican people